South Pointe High School is the third and newest high school in Rock Hill, South Carolina, USA. The school is part of York County School District Three (Rock Hill Schools). It has an enrollment of approximately 1,402 students in grades 9–12.

Athletics
From 2010–2012, South Pointe Athletics competed in Region 4 of AAA along with Chester High, Fairfield Central High, Fort Mill High, Nation Ford High and York Comprehensive High. In 2011, it was announced by the SC High School League that South Pointe would move to AAAA and compete in Region 3 with the other 6 York County, SC high schools (Clover, Fort Mill, Nation Ford, Northwestern, Rock Hill, and York Comprehensive) as well as Lancaster. In 2013, it was announced that the Stallions will be moved backed down to AAA athletics.

South Pointe's teams are the Stallions. Boys' sports include: baseball, basketball, cross country, American football, golf, soccer, swimming, tennis, track & field, and wrestling; while girls' sports include: basketball, cheerleading, cross country, dance, golf, soccer, softball, swimming, track & field, and volleyball.

Football

South Pointe has seen great success on the gridiron in the limited time the school has been around. They struggled in the first two varsity years in 2006 and 2007. They then broke out with an undefeated 15–0 record in 2008, winning the Division II AAAA state championship. They lost in the AAAA upper state championship in 2009 and suffered a defeat in the 2010 AAA state championship. They won their second state championship in the 2011 AAA state championship going 14–1 that year. The Stallions made it back to the 2012 AAAA upper state championship before being defeated by Greenwood High School 35–31. South Pointe's Varsity is coached by Bobby Collins, Collins is the school’s fourth football coach since South Pointe opened in 2005.

Swimming
The Stallion Swim Team competes in Region IV–AAA and are under supervision by Head Coach Adam Rainey. The Lady Stallion Swim Team has compiled a 21–3 record in Rainey's three seasons with the team. They have consistently broken and reset new school records (45 to date). Seven female swimmers have found national placement as of 2012. Izzi Woodard is the school's first female state champion and swim champion for South Pointe High. She won the Women's 100 yard Breaststroke at the 2011 AAA State Finals in Columbia, SC.

Athletic honors
Football
 Division II AAAA State Championship: 2008, 2016, 2017
 Division ll AAA State Championship: 2011, 2014, 2015

Swimming
 Division II AAA State Qualifier: 2011

Academics
South Pointe offers a wide variety of courses which range from Foreign Language, Computers, Engineering, Art, and core classes. Also for those who want to challenge themselves they also offer Honors, AP (Advanced Placement), Dual Credit, and IB (International Baccalaureate). All of these varied ways of learning allow South Pointe students to excel. The IB and AP programs are the highest choices available. Here the smartest kids test their ability to be challenged with a variety of cultural and technological courses.

School newspaper
South Pointe has an award-winning school newspaper, "SPiN" (South Pointe in the News). In addition, South Pointe added an online version to their paper copy of the newspaper, called "SPiN WIRED" in 2009. The site is said to display the latest news, sports, pictures and more from the school and throughout the community.

Notable alumni

 Jadeveon Clowney  NFL defensive end, 3x Pro Bowl selection
 Montay Crockett  NFL wide receiver
 Stephon Gilmore  NFL cornerback, 3x Pro Bowl selection, Super Bowl LIII champion for the New England Patriots
 DeVonte Holloman  NFL linebacker
 Anthony Johnson  NFL wide receiver
 Derion Kendrick  NFL cornerback
 Nick McCloud  NFL cornerback

References

Buildings and structures in Rock Hill, South Carolina
Public high schools in South Carolina
Schools in York County, South Carolina
2005 establishments in South Carolina
Educational institutions established in 2005